Leparsky or Leparski (Russian: Лепарский) is a Slavic masculine surname, its feminine counterpart is Leparskaya. It may refer to
Feliks Leparsky (1875–1917), Russian fencer
Irina Leparskaya (born 1957), Soviet rhythmic gymnastics coach

Russian-language surnames